Marston is a village and civil parish  south of Stoke-on-Trent, in the Stafford district, in the county of Staffordshire, England. In 2011 the parish had a population of 158. The parish touches Creswell, Hopton and Coton, Salt and Enson, Sandon and Burston, Stone Rural and Whitgreave.

Features 
There are 2 listed buildings in Marston. Marston has a church called St Leonard.

History 
The name "Marston" means 'Marsh farm/settlement'. Marston was recorded in the Domesday Book as Mer(se)tone. Marston was formerly a township and chapelry in the parish of Stafford, St Mary, on 24 March 1884 part of the parish was transferred to Tillington, the transferred area had 107 houses in 1891. On 25 March 1885 part of "Salt and Enson" was transferred to the parish, the transferred area had 2 houses in 1891, and on 1 April 1934, 53 acres were transferred to Marston from "Salt and Enson". On 1 April 1934, the parish of Yarlet was abolished and merged with Marston. Yarlet is a deserted medieval village in the parish.

References 

Villages in Staffordshire
Civil parishes in Staffordshire
Borough of Stafford